Babou is a given name or surname. It may refer to:

Babou (singer) (born 1994), full name Babou Nicolai Nelson Lowe, Danish-Gambian singer 
Babou Sidiki Barro (born 1990), Ivorian football (soccer) player
Edgar Babou (born 1970), Ivorian rugby union player
Fanny Babou (born 1989), French swimmer
Philibert Babou (c. 1484–1557), cryptographer, trésorier, minister of finance for Francis I, mayor of Tours in 1520
Philibert Babou de la Bourdaisière (1513–1570), Roman Catholic bishop and cardinal
Babou (ocelot), the pet ocelot of Salvador Dalí

See also
Baboo (disambiguation)